Bobby Digital in Stereo is the debut studio album by American rapper and producer RZA. It was released on November 24, 1998, and was certified Gold on February 5, 1999, by the Recording Industry Association of America (RIAA). It is an experimental album that is based on a story featuring him rhyming as a hedonistic, fun-loving alter-ego named Bobby Digital and showcasing a unique keyboard-driven sound (rather than samples) that RZA called digital orchestra, receiving mostly positive, though somewhat mixed, reviews.

Background 
He explained the origins of Bobby Digital, saying:

Music

Lyrical content 
On the pseudonym and character of Bobby Digital, which dominated the album's lyrics, RZA later stated:

Production 
The sound of the album is largely keyboard-driven, but there are still samples. On the sound of Bobby Digital, RZA stated:

Track listing 
Track listing information is taken from the official liner notes. Tracks 1-17 are Bobby Digital songs, while tracks 18-21 are RZA songs.

Notes
 "Intro" contains vocals by Frank "Foxy" Niedlich.
 "Slow Grind African" contains vocals by Lisa I'Anson.
 "Love Jones" is erroneously credited to King Tech, who produced "Airwaves".
 "Slow Grind French" contains vocals by Victorie Heathcole.
 "Kiss Of A Black Widow" contains raps by Ol' Dirty Bastard, not the entire Wu-Tang Clan.
 "Slow Grind Italian" contains vocals by Lorenza Calamanderi.
 "Do You Here The Bells" is listed as Special Bonus Track For Japan Only.

Sample list
 "Love Jones" contains a sample of "Star Children" performed by Mighty Ryeders.
 "Kiss Of A Black Widow" contains a sample of "Over" performed by Portishead.
 "My Lovin' Is Digi" contains a sample of "It Ain't Easy" performed by Syl Johnson.

Personnel 
 Barney Chase – Engineer, Mixing
 Gabe Chiesa – Engineer
 Tom Coyne – Mastering
 Inspectah – Producer
 King Tech – Producer, Engineer, Mixing
 Nolan "Dr. No" Moffitte – Engineer, Mixing
 Carl Nappa – Mixing
 Tony Prendatt – Engineer, Mixing
 RZA – Producer, Engineer, Mixing
 Miles Showell – Mastering, Assembly

Charts

Weekly charts

Year-end charts

Certifications

References

External links 
 RZA as Bobby Digital "Holocaust (Silkworm)" Video
 RZA "Domestic Violence" Video
 RZA featuring Beretta 9 "Daily Routine" Video

1998 debut albums
RZA albums
Albums produced by RZA
Gee Street Records albums
Concept albums